The NKOTBSB Tour was a co-headlining concert tour between American boy bands New Kids on the Block and the Backstreet Boys, who together formed NKOTBSB. The tour visited North America in 2011. Europe, Australia and Asia were added to the itinerary for 2012. The tour ranked 44th in Pollstar's "Top 50 Worldwide Tour (Mid-Year)", earning over 10 million dollars. At the conclusion of 2011, the tour placed 8th on Billboard's annual "Top 25 Tours", earning over $76 million with 51 shows.

The London concert on April 29, 2012 in O2 Arena was shown live at select movie theaters at 9PM CET and streamed live with pay per view system.

Background

During the summer of 2010, the Backstreet Boys joined New Kids on the Block onstage at the Radio City Music Hall (as a part of NKOTB Casi-NO Tour), where the groups performed "I Want It That Way". Since the performance, the media began to circulate rumors of the two uniting for a tour in the summer of 2011.

The tour was officially announced on On Air with Ryan Seacrest during an interview, where it was mentioned the groups were recording a single to be later released. To promote the tour further, the groups conducted a live Q&A session on Ustream. The groups also performed at the 38th Annual American Music Awards to give the public a taste of what they would see on the tour. For an interview on Entertainment Tonight, Donnie Wahlberg held a picture of the proposed staging, which featured a standard concert stage with an extended catwalk leading to a circular platform.

Opening acts
Ashlyne Huff (North America)
Jordin Sparks (North America, select dates)
Midnight Red (North America, select dates)
Matthew Morrison (North America, select dates)
Neverest (North America, select dates; Germany)
A Friend in London (Europe, except Germany)
Johnny Ruffo (Australia)

Setlist
NKOTBSB
Medley: "Single" / "The One" (contains elements of "Viva la Vida")
New Kids on the Block
"Summertime"
Backstreet Boys
"The Call"
New Kids on the Block
"Dirty Dancing"
Backstreet Boys
"Get Down (You're the One for Me)"
New Kids on the Block
"You Got It (The Right Stuff)"
Backstreet Boys
"Larger Than Life"
New Kids on the Block
<li>"Didn't I (Blow Your Mind This Time)"
"Valentine Girl"
"If You Go Away"
<li>"Please Don't Go Girl"
Backstreet Boys
<li>"Show Me the Meaning of Being Lonely"
"10,000 Promises"
"I'll Never Break Your Heart"
"Inconsolable" (North America Leg only)
"Drowning"
<li>"Incomplete"
New Kids on the Block
<li>"Step By Step" (contains elements of "Push It")
"Cover Girl"
"My Favorite Girl"
"Games"
"Click Click Click" (North America Leg only)
<li>"Tonight"
Backstreet Boys
<li>"Shape of My Heart"
"As Long As You Love Me"
"All I Have to Give"
"If You Stay" (contains excerpts of "Raspberry Beret") (North America Leg only)
"We've Got It Goin' On" (Europe/Australia/Asia Leg only) (contains elements of "Can You Feel It")
<li>"Quit Playing Games (With My Heart)" (contains elements of "Don't Stop 'Til You Get Enough")
New Kids on the Block
"I'll Be Loving You (Forever)"
Backstreet Boys
"I Want It That Way"
NKOTBSB
"Don't Turn Out the Lights"
Backstreet Boys
"Everybody (Backstreet's Back)" (contains elements of "Back in Black")
New Kids on the Block
"Hangin’ Tough" (contains excerpts from "We Will Rock You")
NKOTBSB
Medley: "Everybody (Backstreet's Back)" / "Hangin’ Tough" (Reprise)

Source:

Tour dates

Festivals and other miscellaneous performances
This concert is a part of the Calgary Stampede

External links
 NKOTB Official Website
 Backstreet Boys Official Website

References

Backstreet Boys concert tours
New Kids on the Block concert tours
2011 concert tours
2012 concert tours
Co-headlining concert tours
Concerts at Malmö Arena